Charles F. Ploeger (August 4, 1870 – May 26, 1916) was an American farmer, businessman, and politician.

Born in the town of Ellington, Outagamie County, Wisconsin, Ploeger moved with his parents to the town of Seymour. Ploeger was a farmer and livestock raiser. He was also involved with the fire insurance business and was president of the Seymour State Bank. Ploeger was involved with the Seymour Fair Association. Ploeger served as Seymour Town Clerk and as chairman of the Seymour Town Board. Seymour served on the school board and was the board clerk. Ploeger served in the Wisconsin State Assembly and was a Republican. Ploeger died of pneumonia at his home in Seymour, Wisconsin while still in office.

References

1870 births
1916 deaths
People from Ellington, Wisconsin
Businesspeople from Wisconsin
Farmers from Wisconsin
Mayors of places in Wisconsin
School board members in Wisconsin
Republican Party members of the Wisconsin State Assembly
19th-century American politicians
Deaths from pneumonia in Wisconsin